Esler may refer to:
Surname
Ben Esler, Australian actor
Erminda Rentoul Esler (1852–1924), Irish novelist
Gavin Esler (born 1953), Scottish journalist, television presenter and author
Murray Esler, AM (born 1943), clinical cardiologist and medical scientist, Melbourne, Australia
Philip Esler (born 1952), Portland Chair in New Testament Studies at the University of Gloucestershire
Ty Esler, former Australian rules football player
Frank Esler-Smith (born 1948), arranger and keyboard player for the soft rock band Air Supply

Given name
Esler Dening GCMG OBE (1897–1977), British diplomat

Places
Esler Airfield, military and public use airfield in Rapides Parish, Louisiana, United States
Páirc Esler, a Gaelic Athletic Association stadium in Newry, County Down, Northern Ireland

See also
Eisler
Elssler
Esenler
Besler (disambiguation)
Fesler
Hesler (disambiguation)
Kesler
Nesler